Alice Thourot (born 12 October 1985) is a French politician of La République En Marche! (LREM) who served as a member of the French National Assembly from 2017 to 2022 elections, representing Drôme's 2nd constituency.

Political career
In parliament, Thourot served as member of the Committee on Legal Affairs. From 2019, she was also a member of the French delegation to the Franco-German Parliamentary Assembly.

Together with Jean-Michel Fauvergue, Thourot co-authored a 2018 report with more than 70 recommendations on how to support security forces and the Municipal Police in France. In 2020, she served as co-capporteur (alongside Fauvergue) on a law proposed by Minister of the Interior Gérald Darmanin to criminalize the dissemination of images showing law enforcement officers with the intention of harming them. On 20 November she proposed for vote the global security law project along with Jean-Michel Feaurge.

Thourot did not seek re-election in the 2022 French legislative election.

Political positions
In July 2019, Thourot voted in favour of the French ratification of the European Union’s Comprehensive Economic and Trade Agreement (CETA) with Canada.

Other activities
 French Office for the Protection of Refugees and Stateless Persons (OFPRA), Member of the Board of Directors

See also
 2017 French legislative election

References

1985 births
Living people
People from Bar-le-Duc
Deputies of the 15th National Assembly of the French Fifth Republic
La République En Marche! politicians
21st-century French women politicians
Women members of the National Assembly (France)